Jailbait is an American improvised comedy web series starring John Lehr as Oswald "Ozzie" O'Connor,  a guy who accidentally buys drugs in a sting operation and is sent to prison. Ten episodes premiered on April 1, 2011 on Crackle.com It was not renewed for a second season.

References

External links

American comedy web series
Crackle (streaming service) original programming